Wingdale is a hamlet and census-designated place (CDP) in the town of Dover in Dutchess County, New York, United States. It was first listed as a CDP prior to the 2020 census.

The community is in southeastern Dutchess County, in the southern part of Dover. The hamlet of Wingdale is in the northern part of the CDP, while a campus of Olivet University is in the south, on the grounds of the former Harlem Valley State Hospital, and scattered housing occupies the hills in the eastern part of the CDP. The Swamp River, a north-flowing tributary of the Tenmile River, part of the Housatonic River watershed, runs through the center of the CDP.

New York State Route 22 runs through the CDP, passing east of Wingdale hamlet. The highway leads north  to Dover Plains and south the same distance to Pawling. State Route 55 runs concurrently with NY 22 to the south, but turns east at Wingdale and leads  to Gaylordsville, Connecticut.

The Metro-North Harlem Valley–Wingdale station is adjacent to Olivet University in the southern part of the CDP.

Demographics

Attractions
Wingdale is the former home of the Dover Drag Strip, a dragstrip that existed from 1961 to 1976.

References 

Census-designated places in Dutchess County, New York
Census-designated places in New York (state)